is a public wooded area in Toshima Ward, Tokyo, Japan. Officially, it is not a public park, but a "forest for the residents of the ward" as designated by Toshima Ward. It is open throughout the year.

Facilities
Mejiro-no-Mori mainly consists of a small wooded area, but there are also benches, a log house (information center), a toilet with wheelchair access, a small pond (called Tonbo Ike (Dragonfly Pond)) and a sculpture.

Attractions
Various bird species can be found in Mejiro-no-Mori, including Japanese tit (Parus minor), brown-eared bulbul (Hypsipetes amaurotis) and Japanese bush warbler (Horornis diphone). Also, freshwater crayfish (Procambarus clarkii) and dragonflies can be found in the pond. The trees and plants include crape myrtle (Lagerstroemia indica), Itajii Chinkapin (Castanopsis sieboldii), Chinese soapberry (Sapindus mukorossi) and the mochi tree (Ilex integra).

Gallery

See also
 Parks and gardens in Tokyo
 National Parks of Japan

References

External links
 www.city.toshima.lg.jp
Parks and gardens in Tokyo